Rhomboidederes is a genus of beetles in the family Cerambycidae, containing the following species:

 Rhomboidederes iuba Galileo & Martins, 2010
 Rhomboidederes minutus Napp & Martins, 1984
 Rhomboidederes ocellicollis Zajciw, 1963
 Rhomboidederes ravidus (Gounelle, 1909)
 Rhomboidederes unicolor (Zajciw, 1967)

References

Elaphidiini